Gregg Lee Henry (born May 6, 1952) is an American character actor and rock, blues and country musician.

He is best known for his performance as serial killer Dennis Rader in the made-for-television film The Hunt for the BTK Killer, and for playing various "heavies" in various films, such as in Payback (1999) and Brian De Palma's Body Double (1984), the latter of whom Henry has collaborated with frequently over the years, acting in six De Palma films.

Biography
Henry was born May 6, 1952, in Lakewood, Colorado. He has been featured in over 75 television programs, including The Riches; Firefly; Gilmore Girls; 24; Airwolf; CSI: Crime Scene Investigation; Murder, She Wrote; Gilmore Girls; Matlock; In The Heat Of The Night;  L.A. Law; Falcon Crest; Designing Women; Moonlighting; Magnum, P.I.; Rich Man, Poor Man Book II; The Mentalist; Castle; Glee; Burn Notice and Breakout Kings.

He played Hugh Pannetta alongside Eddie Izzard and Minnie Driver on the FX television series The Riches. He played the role of Dobbs in the USA Network series White Collar and Hollis Doyle on the ABC series Scandal. Starting June 10, 2013, he played Detective Carl Reddick in The Killing. In 2014, he had a small role in the Marvel film Guardians of the Galaxy as well as its sequel as Peter Quill's grandfather. He appeared in recurring roles in Hell on Wheels and The Following. He also portrayed the title role in Shakespeare's Julius Caesar in 2017's Shakespeare in the Park in New York City.

Personal life
Henry is married to American theatre director Lisa James.

Filmography

Film

Television

Video games

References

External links

 
 

1952 births
Living people
American male singer-songwriters
American blues singers
American country singer-songwriters
American male film actors
American rock singers
American male stage actors
American male television actors
American male voice actors
Male actors from Colorado
People from Lakewood, Colorado
20th-century American male actors
21st-century American male actors
Singer-songwriters from Colorado